Karel Abraham (born 2 January 1990) is a retired motorcycle racer from the Czech Republic. In  he won the Moto2 Valencian Grand Prix and finished third at Twin Ring Motegi in the same class. His father, also called Karel Abraham, has owned Brno Circuit since December 2005.

Career

125cc World Championship
In  he rode for his father's AB Motoracing team.

250cc World Championship

Moto2 World Championship
In , Abraham and AB Motoracing competed in the new Moto2 class, using RSV and FTR chassis. Abraham took his and his team's first victory in Valencia.

MotoGP World Championship

For  Abraham switched to an ART-Aprilia running under CRT regulations, He finished the season in 24th place overall with just 5 points. He obtained the 17th position in the riders' championship. In  Abraham struggled with the Honda RC213V-RS and did not score any points.

Superbike World Championship
On 21 November 2015, Milwaukee BMW announced that Abraham would race for the team for the  season of the Superbike World Championship, partnering 2015 British Superbike Championship winner Josh Brookes.

Return to MotoGP
Abraham returned to MotoGP in  riding a Ducati for the Pull&Bear Aspar Team. He raced for Avintia Racing on a Ducati in 2019. His contract was terminated at the end of the season.

Career statistics

Grand Prix motorcycle racing

By season

By class

Races by year
(key) (Races in bold indicate pole position; races in italics indicate fastest lap)

Superbike World Championship

Races by year
(key) (Races in bold indicate pole position; races in italics indicate fastest lap)

References

External links

 

1990 births
Living people
Sportspeople from Brno
125cc World Championship riders
250cc World Championship riders
Czech motorcycle racers
Moto2 World Championship riders
Aspar Racing Team MotoGP riders
Superbike World Championship riders
Ángel Nieto Team MotoGP riders
MotoGP World Championship riders
Avintia Racing MotoGP riders